Aberdeen station is a former Baltimore and Ohio Railroad (B&O) station in Aberdeen, Maryland. The station was designed by architect Frank Furness, who designed some 40 stations for the B&O in Delaware, Maryland, and Pennsylvania. The station has deteriorated in condition mightily since B&O ended service in 1955, and was almost torn down in 2003. An eleventh hour agreement was made by CSX and the Historical Society of Harford County to save the building.  The station was transferred from the Historical Society of Harford County to the Aberdeen Historical Museum in 2016.

Station house
Aberdeen Station was built in a Queen Anne style of architecture. It is located on the west side of the single tracked (formerly double tracked) CSX Philadelphia Subdivision, and south of Bel Air Avenue (Maryland Route 132). The building is one-and-a-half stories tall, and was described as the type of station where the agent would live above the waiting room. The building is also the last wooden station remaining on the Baltimore–Philadelphia line, and one of the few stations Frank Furness designed that is still standing. The same plan was used to build the B&O's Cowenton station, which was demolished.

History
The first B&O service to Aberdeen used the Philadelphia, Wilmington and Baltimore Railroad (PW&B) between Baltimore and New York City, now a part of Amtrak's Northeast Corridor. Rival Pennsylvania Railroad (PRR) began using the PW&B after opening its line between Washington, D.C. and Baltimore. This caused a power struggle between the B&O and the PRR.

References

Former Baltimore and Ohio Railroad stations
Transportation buildings and structures in Harford County, Maryland
Railway stations in the United States opened in 1885
Queen Anne architecture in Maryland
Former railway stations in Maryland